Manama is a village in Manama ward the province of Matabeleland South, Zimbabwe. It is located south of Gwanda on the road to Kafusi.

The village is a rural service centre with a Lutheran Mission that has a hospital and a high school, a small commercial centre and a bus rank.

The Thuli River runs through the town.

Populated places in Matabeleland South Province